Aaron Hamburger (born 1973) is an American writer best known for his short story collection The View from Stalin's Head (2004) and novels Faith for Beginners (2005) and Nirvana Is Here (2019).

Born in Detroit, Michigan, Hamburger went to college at the University of Michigan (BA 1995) and then spent a year abroad teaching English in Prague, Czech Republic, the setting for his first book of stories, primarily about the lives of expatriates after the end of the Cold War.  The View from Stalin's Head was awarded the Rome Prize by the American Academy of Arts and Letters and the American Academy in Rome.  His next book, Faith for Beginners, is a novel about a dysfunctional family vacation in Jerusalem, and was nominated for a Lambda Literary Award. His novel Nirvana Is Here was published in 2019 and won a Bronze Medal in the 2019 Forewords Indie Awards.

Hamburger's writing has appeared in The New York Times, The Washington Post, The Chicago Tribune, Tin House, O, the Oprah Magazine, Subtropics, Crazyhorse, Boulevard, Tablet, The Village Voice, Out, Poets and Writers, Details, Nerve, and Time Out New York. He has won fellowships from the Civitella Ranieri Foundation, the DC Commission on the Arts and Humanities, and the Edward F. Albee Foundation and first place in the David J. Dornstein Contest for Young Jewish Writers. He has taught writing at Columbia University, the George Washington University, the Stonecoast MFA Program, and American Language Institute (New York University).

References

External links
 Aaron Hamburger.com
 The Washington Post Fall 2005 anticipated books

1973 births
Living people
American male novelists
American male short story writers
American short story writers
University of Michigan alumni
Columbia University faculty
Writers from Detroit
American gay writers
Jewish American novelists
LGBT Jews
American LGBT novelists
LGBT people from Michigan
21st-century American novelists
21st-century American male writers
Novelists from Michigan
Novelists from New York (state)
21st-century American Jews
21st-century LGBT people
Jewish American short story writers